Battle of the Yalu River(Amnok River) may refer to:

 Battle of the Yalu River (1894), during the First Sino-Japanese War
 Battle of the Yalu River (1904), during the Russo-Japanese War